Gustaf Adolf Arell (26 May 1886 – ??) was a Swedish missionary and linguist. He served with the Mission Union of Sweden in Chinese Turkestan (present day Xinjiang).

On 16 October 1915 he married Johanna Katarina Arell.

References

Bibliography
J. Lundahl (editor), På obanade stigar: Tjugofem år i Ost-Turkestan. Stockholm, Svenska Missionsförbundet Förlag, 1917

External links
Mission and Change in Eastern Turkestan (English Translation of select chapters of Mission och revolution i Centralasien)

Swedish Protestant missionaries
Protestant missionaries in China
1886 births
Christian missionaries in Central Asia
Year of death missing
Swedish expatriates in China